Sindhu Bhairavi is a 1985 Indian Tamil-language musical drama film written and directed by K. Balachander. The film stars Sivakumar, Suhasini and Sulakshana. It revolves around the three lead characters: a Carnatic singer J. K. Balaganapathi (JKB), his wife Bhairavi, and his girlfriend Sindhu. At the peak of his career, JKB gets addicted to alcohol following complications with his affair, and his career goes into a downward spiral.

Sindhu Bhairavi released worldwide on 11 November 1985, and opened to positive reviews from critics, and was a blockbuster. The film won three National Awards for Best Actress (Suhasini), Best Music Direction (Ilaiyaraaja) and Best Female Playback Singer (K. S. Chithra), in addition to the Filmfare Award for Best Film – Tamil. The film has a sequel in the format of a television series named Sahana (2003), produced by Balachander, with Sulakshana reprising her role.

Plot 
J. K. Balaganapathi (JKB) is a gifted Carnatic singer, but his wife Bhairavi, despite her love and loyalty, fails to satisfy or challenge him intellectually. For JKB, this and her inability to have children, is a problem. JKB's band includes the mridangam player Gurumoorthy, and the tanpura player Gajapathi, who is a compulsive liar.

JKB goes to a concert where he finds Gurumoorthy drunk. He instructs Gurumoorthy to leave the premises and performs in the concert without the use of the mridangam, which is considered a basic/compulsory instrument to perform a Carnatic concert. When Gurumoorthy is asked to permanently leave the band, he promises not to drink again.

While Bhairavi's grandfather is going to receive his pension, which he does on the first of every month, Gajapathi lies to him that his pension has been cancelled. The old man starts crying, and JKB intervenes to confirm that his pension is not cancelled and that he can go and collect it. JKB then scolds Gajapathi for it and tells him the old man could have died on hearing such a lie as he is very particular about his pension. Following this, when JKB finds that Gajapathi has lied to him too and others causing problems, he asks him to promise to speak the truth.

Sindhu, a music teacher in a school, attends one of the concerts of JKB, where he is performing a Tyagaraja keerthana which is in Telugu. She finds some the audience speaking to each other instead of listening to the music. Hence, she asks JKB to translate the song that he is singing into Tamil, which everybody in the audience can understand. He then gets angry and challenges her to demonstrate. She successfully demonstrates it and is applauded by the audience, causing JKB to leave without completing the concert.

A few days later, Sindhu apologises to JKB, and he finds out that she is an intellectual equal and admires her knowledge of music. However, this intellectual attraction is misunderstood based on the cultural limitations. Gajapathi, who has promised not to lie, informs Bhairavi that her husband is going out with Sindhu. Meanwhile, Sindhu really has fallen for JKB, and both of them get intimate with each other.

One day, JKB is caught coming out of Sindhu's apartment by Bhairavi. Sindhu is seen as the home wrecker and is forced to end her association with JKB. He pines for her and leans on alcohol for support, which leads to his downward spiral, ending in an embarrassing barter of his musical knowledge for a drink. He even steals money from Bhairavi's grandfather, which leads to his death. Sindhu re-enters his life and brings him around; however, she has a secret of her own: her pregnancy. After Sindhu rehabilitates JKB, his friends pressurise her to leave the town and never come back, which she does the next day. Bhairavi and JKB are distraught as Bhairavi had agreed to marry Sindhu to JKB.

Months later, during one of JKB's concerts, Sindhu is seen coming back and sitting down to listen to his music. However, she refuses to marry JKB, saying that she would not deny Bhairavi her rights. Instead she leaves them with a "present"; Sindhu gives up her child to be brought up by Bhairavi in a classic act of defiance to society's rules and leaves town to pursue and share her knowledge of music with the less fortunate.

Cast 
 Sivakumar as J. K. Balaganapathi (JKB)
 Suhasini as Sindhu
 Sulakshana as Bhairavi
 Delhi Ganesh as Gurumoorthy
 Janagaraj as Gajapathi
 Pratap as Sanjeevi
 T. S. Raghavendra as Judge Bharathi Kannan
 Manimala as Sindhu's mother
 Kavithalayaa Krishnan as Bharathi Kannan's driver
 R. Sundaramoorthy as JKB's driver

Production 
Sivakumar recalled the instance when he had to grapple with high tides when he sat on the rocks at the Visakhapatnam beach during the shoot. He recalled, "Nothing would deter KB [Balachander] from extracting the best out of the actors. He would ask us to get ready for a retake even if he finds a slightest slip in our performance". When offered to act in the film by Balachander, Suhasini agreed after knowing that he would enact and explain every scene. Suhasini and Sulakshana's characters were named after the two parts of the name of the Carnatic raga, Sindhu Bhairavi. Delhi Ganesh was asked by Balachander to portray a mridangam player, and though he did not know how to play the instrument, he had a sense of rhythm and soon became "engrossed in the role".

Themes and influences 
The film's theme is based on extramarital affairs interwoven with Carnatic music. Ajayan Bala stated: "most compatible minds in Sindhu Bhairavi, the singer and his fan, were not allowed to live together, even after the wife reconciled herself to that". Kandhasamy, Balachander's son-in-law, stated, "Sindhu Bhairavi established the sanctity of the institution of marriage and the dignity of the concubine". Sowmya Rajendran compared the film to another Sivakumar starrer Rosappu Ravikkaikari (1979) due to adultery being the mutual theme, the difference being that Sivakumar's character in Sindhu Bhairavi is the adulterous one, unlike Rosappu Ravikkaikari where it is his wife.

Soundtrack 
The soundtrack was composed by Ilaiyaraaja. Sindhu Bhairavi is Balachander's first collaboration with Ilaiyaraaja. Balachander recalled that, after doing several films with M. S. Viswanathan, he wanted a different composer for Sindhu Bhairavi, so he approached Ilaiyaraaja after seeking permission from Viswanathan. When the song "Paadariyen" was to be set to tune, Ilaiyaraaja asked Balachander for a day's time. The next day he was ready with the tune, which Balachander described as a "folk song with a blend of Carnatic music".

Many of the songs are set in Carnatic ragas; "Naanoru Sindhu" is in Sindhu Bhairavi, "Kalaivaniye" in Kalyani, "Poomaalai" in Kanada, "Paadariyen" in Saramati, "Aanantha Nadanam" in Rathipatipriya, and "Thanni Thotti Thedi Vantha" in Kapi. Ilaiyaraaja composed "Kalaivaniye" entirely in Arohana without Avarohana, which he considers practically impossible. "Mahaganapathim" is based on the composition of the same name by Muthuswami Dikshitar. "Moham Ennum" and "Manadhil Urudhi Vendum" were taken from the verses of poet Subramania Bharati.

Historian G. Dhananjayan considers Sindhu Bhairavi a film where Balachander was successful in reflecting the thoughts of Ilaiyaraaja. Innovatively, there is no use of mridangam in "Mahaganapathim". "Mari Mari Ninne" by the Carnatic musician Tyagaraja, was reused in this film. Ilaiyaraaja faced staunch opposition from classical musicians for having changed the original raga from Khamboji to Saramati.

Release and reception 
Sindhu Bhairavi was released on 11 November 1985, coinciding with Diwali. In a review dated, 24 November 1985, Tamil magazine Ananda Vikatan rated the film 55 out of 100. Jayamanmadhan of Kalki wrote in the backdrop of sea waves, memorable locations many of the stories have been woven so densely and added it is the special touch of the director that the film is arranged seamlessly by adding threads to each other while calling Ilayaraja and Yesudas as plus points. The film was a major commercial success, running for over 175 days in theatres. The 175th day celebration was held at a theatre in Madurai.

Accolades 
At the 33rd National Film Awards, Sindhu Bhairavi won in three categories: Best Actress (Suhasini), Best Music Direction (Ilaiyaraaja) and Best Female Playback Singer (K. S. Chithra). The film also won the Filmfare Award for Best Film – Tamil.

Sequel 
A sequel in the form of a TV series named Sahana, also created by Balachander, premiered on Jaya TV on 24 February 2003. While JKB and Sindhu were portrayed by Y. G. Mahendran and Anuradha Krishnamoorthy, Sulakshana was the only actor to return in the same role.

References

Bibliography

External links 
 

1980s musical drama films
1980s Tamil-language films
1985 drama films
1985 films
Films about alcoholism
Films about music and musicians
Films directed by K. Balachander
Films featuring a Best Actress National Award-winning performance
Films scored by Ilaiyaraaja
Films with screenplays by K. Balachander
Indian musical drama films